Goran Jagar (born 10 June 1984 in Virovitica, SR Croatia, Yugoslavia) is a Serbian rower.

References 
 
 

1984 births
Living people
Sportspeople from Virovitica
Serbs of Croatia
Serbian male rowers
Sportspeople from Belgrade
Olympic rowers of Serbia
Rowers at the 2008 Summer Olympics
Rowers at the 2012 Summer Olympics
World Rowing Championships medalists for Serbia
European champions for Serbia
Mediterranean Games bronze medalists for Serbia
Competitors at the 2009 Mediterranean Games
Mediterranean Games medalists in rowing
European Rowing Championships medalists